Terrence Funk (born June 30, 1944) is an American retired professional wrestler, musician, disc jockey and actor. Funk is known for the longevity of his career – which spanned more than 50 years and included multiple short-lived retirements – and the influential hardcore wrestling style he pioneered in the latter part of his career. He is considered one of the greatest professional wrestlers of all time.

Over the course of his career, Funk has wrestled for numerous major promotions, among them All Japan Pro Wrestling, Extreme Championship Wrestling, the International Wrestling Association of Japan, Frontier Martial-Arts Wrestling, the United States Wrestling Association, World Championship Wrestling, the World Wrestling Federation and multiple National Wrestling Alliance territories including Big Time Wrestling, Championship Wrestling from Florida, Georgia Championship Wrestling and Stampede Wrestling. He was the promoter of the Amarillo-based Western States Sports promotion.

Championships held by Funk include the ECW World Heavyweight Championship, NWA World Heavyweight Championship, USWA Unified World Heavyweight Championship, WWF World Tag Team Championship, and ECW World Television Championship. He headlined ECW's premier annual pay-per-view event, November to Remember, three times. Funk has been inducted into multiple halls of fame, among them WWE, WCW, NWA, and Hardcore.

Early life
Funk was born on June 30, 1944, in Hammond, Indiana. He is the son of Dorothy (Culver) and Dory Funk, a professional wrestler and promoter. Following the end of World War II, the family relocated to Amarillo, Texas, where Terry and his brother, known professionally as Dory Jr., grew up in the professional wrestling business. After graduating from high school, Funk attended West Texas State University (now West Texas A&M University), where he competed in amateur wrestling and football.

Professional wrestling career

Western States Sports (1965–1979)

Funk started his career in 1965, working in his father Dory Funk's, Western States Sports promotion in Amarillo, Texas. His debut match was against Sputnik Monroe on December 9. He and his brother, Dory Funk Jr., quickly rose up the ranks as a team and in single matches against top names like Ernie Ladd and Hank James. They became big money wrestlers by the end of the decade.

Championship Wrestling from Florida (1970–1982) 
In 1975, Terry defeated Jack Brisco for the NWA World Heavyweight Championship in Miami, when Dory failed to appear for a title shot. He began a 14 month title reign defending the title against Jack Brisco, Dusty Rhodes, Carlos Rocha, Giant Baba, and Pat O'Connor. In addition to North America, he defended the belt in Australia, Japan and Singapore. The historic reign ended in Toronto when he was defeated by "Handsome" Harley Race, who had earlier beaten Dory, Jr., for NWA World Heavyweight Championship before losing it to Jack Brisco. Race lifted Funk for a shinbreaker and then trapped him in an Indian death leglock. When Funk failed to respond to referee Fred Atkins the match was stopped.

During 1981, Terry spent some time in the Continental Wrestling Association feuding with Jerry Lawler. The most memorable match in this feud happened in April 1981 at the Mid South Coliseum in Memphis, Tennessee. The match took place in the empty arena, with only Lance Russell, a cameraman, and a photographer present. Funk had challenged Lawler to this match at this time because he felt he was getting unfairly treated in Memphis. The confrontation only lasted a few minutes, and ended with Funk trying to put Lawler's eye out with a broken 2x4. But Lawler kicked Funk's elbow, causing him to hit himself in the eye. The tape aired on April 25, 1981.

All Japan Pro Wrestling (1972–1991) 
Terry and Dory, Jr. also made a name for themselves in Japan. Terry became a star in the eyes of the Japanese fans with his over the top mannerisms, sometimes colorful get-ups, and his brawling ability. In Japan, the Funks were heels until they faced The Sheik and Abdullah The Butcher in Tokyo. The two later faced Stan Hansen, Bruiser Brody, and Giant Baba in memorable feuds as well. The Funk brothers we well known left handed wrestlers in the year 1972.

World Wrestling Federation (1985–1986) 
Terry Funk made his World Wrestling Federation (WWF) debut in 1985 after a brief run in the AWA. In his televised debut on Championship Wrestling, he not only beat Aldo Marino, but he also beat on ring announcer Mel Phillips. Funk attacked Phillips, after Phillips made the mistake of putting on Funk's cowboy hat. Funk also had a gimmick of carrying a branding iron with him to ringside and using it to "brand" his fallen opponents. The attack on Phillips lead to a feud with Junkyard Dog. In the mid-1980s, Funk teamed with Dory (calling himself "Hoss" Funk) and Jimmy Jack Funk, a storyline "brother." They were managed by Jimmy Hart. At the time, he had a heated rivalry with the Junkyard Dog which led to a match between Terry Funk and Hoss Funk and the team of Tito Santana and Junkyard Dog at WrestleMania 2. Terry also had a series of WWF title matches against Hulk Hogan. Funk left the WWF in April 1986.

World Championship Wrestling (1989–1990, 1994) 
Funk joined World Championship Wrestling in 1989 and became part of the J-Tex Corporation. He began feuding with Ric Flair, who had defeated Ricky Steamboat at WrestleWar for the NWA World Heavyweight Championship. Funk, who was one of three judges for the main event, challenged Flair to a title match. Flair refused, saying that Funk was "spending time in Hollywood" instead of focusing on wrestling. Funk then attacked, piledriving Flair on a ringside table. This put the champion, Flair, out of action until the Great American Bash where he faced Funk. Flair won the match by reversing a small package into one of his own, but shortly after was attacked by Gary Hart and The Great Muta. Sting came to aid Flair and the two brawled with Funk and Muta to close the show. Funk got injured but returned to continue feuding with Ric Flair. The two then had an "I Quit" match at Clash of the Champions IX:, which Funk lost after yelling "Yes, I quit!" after Flair put on the Figure four leglock. This match received a 5-star rating from Dave Meltzer. A notable part of the feud occurred when Funk used an actual plastic shopping bag to suffocate Flair on television after Flair and Sting defeated Muta and Dick Slater at Clash of the Champions VIII. After losing a Clash of Champions match against Flair, he shook Flair's hand, and was attacked by Gary Hart's stable. Soon after he became a color commentator and the host of his own segment Funk's Grill where a tuxedo clad Funk would amiably interview the top stars of WCW, both face and heel. This did not last long and he left soon after for the USWA.

In 1994, Funk reappeared in WCW and wrestled Tully Blanchard to a double disqualification at Slamboree 1994 and later that night, he became a member of Colonel Robert Parker's Stud Stable. Along with Bunkhouse Buck, Arn Anderson and Meng, the stable would focus their energies on Dusty and Dustin Rhodes, as well as The Nasty Boys, culminating in a War Games match at Fall Brawl.

International Wrestling Association of Japan (1994–1995)
In 1994, Funk joined the fledgling International Wrestling Association of Japan promotion. Funk would go on to be a participant in IWA's most famous event the King of the Death Match Tournament, held on August 20, 1995, in Kawasaki. Funk would first defeat Leatherface and Tiger Jeet Singh in extreme-style matches which featured barbed wire covered boards, glass, and chains before moving on to the finals of the tournament. In the finals, Funk was defeated by protégé Cactus Jack, later known by US audiences as Mick Foley, in a No Ropes Barbed Wire Exploding Barbed Wire Boards & Exploding Ring Time Bomb Death Match. Terry would also participate in several other deathmatches throughout 1995.

Eastern Championship Wrestling / Extreme Championship Wrestling (1993–1997)
Later in Funk's career, his style changed from wrestling traditional southern style wrestling matches to the more violent style of hardcore wrestling. In 1993, after a special appearance against Blanchard at World Championship Wrestling's Slamboree, Funk promised to help the fledgling Eastern Championship Wrestling (later renamed Extreme Championship Wrestling or ECW) by lending his talent and notoriety to the promotion. On July 16, Terry and Dory Funk lost a barbed wire match against The Public Enemy. Funk maintained a regular schedule of wrestling for ECW in its early days while also competing in Japan. He had many feuds and wrestled programs with wrestlers such as Cactus Jack, "The Franchise" Shane Douglas, The Sandman, Sabu, and Terry's own protege, Tommy Dreamer.

Funk further elevated ECW by headlining their first pay-per-view, Barely Legal on April 13, 1997, winning the ECW World Heavyweight Championship from Raven. Earlier in the night, he defeated The Sandman and Stevie Richards in a Triple Threat match, thus earning him the match with Raven. Funk went on to successfully defend the title in bouts at Chapter 2, The Buffalo Invasion, Wrestlepalooza, and Heat Wave. He was ultimately defeated for the title by Sabu in a barbed wire match at Born to be Wired in August 1997, in which the ropes of the ring were taken down and replaced with barbed wire. Both men had to be cut out of the wires at the end of the match. Sabu had his biceps visibly torn open by the barbed wire – as a result, the wound was taped up and the match continued.

In September 1997, a show was held in Funk's hometown of Amarillo. It was called "Terry Funk's WrestleFest" and was both his own show and a celebration of the careers of Terry, his father, and his brother. Terry lost to then-WWF Champion Bret Hart in the main event, a non-title match. However, before the match, ECW owner Paul Heyman presented Terry with a belt, paid for through a collection taken up by wrestlers on the ECW roster, that declared him the Lifetime ECW World Heavyweight Champion.

World Wrestling Federation (1997–1998)
Funk appeared in the 1997 Royal Rumble match appearing at number 24 and lasting fifteen minutes and eighteen  seconds before being eliminated by Mankind. Funk then returned to ECW before his retirement.
Funk's retirement lasted just 11 days before he returned to the ring. After wrestling in Japan with Frontier Martial-Arts Wrestling and on the United States independent circuit (most notably a bout with Rik Ratchet that drew many fans on the east coast), Funk rejoined the World Wrestling Federation. Funk debuted in the WWF on the December 29, 1997 episode of Raw as the masked "Chainsaw Charlie" (although his true identity was soon acknowledged by the announcers), teaming with Mick Foley, who was wrestling under his Cactus Jack persona. Charlie and Jack began feuding with The New Age Outlaws, where they were defeated by them on the January 26, 1998 episode of Raw by disqualification.

The following week on Raw, Charlie and Jack would have a match against each other, with the match ending in a no contest after the Outlaws would attack both men, placing them both in a dumpster and then pushing it off the stage. At No Way Out of Texas: In Your House, Charlie and Jack would team with Stone Cold Steve Austin and Owen Hart, defeating the team of Triple H, Savio Vega and the Outlaws. At WrestleMania XIV, Charlie and Jack would defeat the Outlaws in a Dumpster match to win the WWF Tag Team Championship. The following night, on the March 30 episode of Raw, Charlie and Jack would lose the titles back to the Outlaws in a Steel Cage match.

On the April 13 episode of Raw, Funk would begin wrestling as himself, and forming a tag team with 2 Cold Scorpio. The team would be short lived, with them defeating the likes of The Quebecers and The Midnight Express. On the May 4 episode of Raw, Funk would be defeated by Foley in a Falls Count Anywhere match. On the June 1 episode of Raw, Funk would be defeated by Mark Henry in a King of the Ring qualifying match. Funk then formed a short lived tag team with Justin Bradshaw, with them defeating Too Much on the July 25 episode of Shotgun Saturday Night. At Fully Loaded: In Your House, Funk and Bradshaw would be defeated by Faarooq and Scorpio, with Bradshaw attacking Funk after the match.

Extreme Championship Wrestling (1998–1999)
At ECW November to Remember, Funk was believed to have been Tommy Dreamer's mystery partner against Justin Credible and Jack Victory. However, the mystery partner turned out to be Jake Roberts. An enraged Funk attacked Dreamer at every opportunity in late 1998 and early 1999. Funk, however, came down ill before they could have a match, and Funk "retired" yet again in mid-1999.

Return to World Championship Wrestling (2000–2001)
Funk wrestled for WCW in 2000 and 2001, winning the WCW Hardcore Championship three times (which stands as the company's record) and the WCW United States Heavyweight Championship for the second time. He was also the WCW Commissioner introduced on the January 3, 2000 episode of Monday Nitro and one time and the leader of the short-lived Old Age Outlaws (Funk, Arn Anderson, Larry Zbyszko and Paul Orndorff) that feuded with the nWo.

Independent circuit (2000–2006)
From 2002 to 2004, Funk was a regular top star for Ring of Honor Wrestling and Major League Wrestling. Funk had several battles with the likes of CM Punk, the Extreme Horsemen (Steve Corino, C. W. Anderson, Justin Credible and Simon Diamond) in specialty matches such as a No Ropes Barbed Wire Death Match, and a 5 on 5 WarGames match. On MLW's final show until 2017, Funk was attacked by his former manager Gary Hart and his syndicate. In November 2004, Funk competed in the UK wrestling company FWA's annual show entitled British Uprising. He teamed with Paul Burchill and Paul Travell, managed by "The Twisted Genius" Dean Ayass, to face The Triad, managed by Greg Lambert, in a 6-Man Tag Team match. Funk's team emerged victorious in front of a crowd of 2,000 people in the Coventry Skydome. In 2005, Funk received an offer from World Wrestling Entertainment to appear at the ECW reunion show One Night Stand, but turned it down in favor of working the ECW nostalgia show Hardcore Homecoming that was being put together by Shane Douglas. At Hardcore Homecoming, Funk lost a three-way barbed wire match to Sabu.

NWA Total Nonstop Action (2004) 
On February 4, 2004, NWA-TNA, Funk and The Sandman lost to The Gathering (CM Punk and Julio Dinero). On February 18, 2004, NWA-TNA, Funk and Raven defeated The Gathering (CM Punk and Julio Dinero).

On May 23, 2009, Funk made an unannounced appearance at a house show for Total Nonstop Action Wrestling. At the show, Terry joined longtime friend, Mick Foley, as special guest enforcers for a match between Scott Steiner and Samoa Joe.

Later returns to WWE (2006, 2009, 2013, 2016)
Funk made a brief return to WWE in 2006, when he appeared on the May 15 episode of Raw, confronting Mick Foley over the attack on Tommy Dreamer on the previous weeks episode of Raw. At ECW One Night Stand, Funk would team with Dreamer and Beulah McGillicutty in a losing effort against Foley, Edge and Lita. Midway through the match, Foley injured Funk's left eye with barbed wire, and Funk was taken backstage. He later returned to the match (with a bloody cloth tied over his eye) to hit Foley with a flaming 2x4 wrapped in barbed wire.

Funk, along with his brother Dory, was inducted in the WWE Hall of Fame in 2009 by his longtime friend Dusty Rhodes. In 2013, Funk inducted Mick Foley into the WWE Hall of Fame. Funk made a cameo appearance on the March 21, 2016 episode of Raw, giving Dean Ambrose a pep-talk for his match against Brock Lesnar at WrestleMania 32. At the conclusion of the segment, Funk presented Ambrose with a chainsaw, in reference to his previous gimmick as Chainsaw Charlie.

Return to the independent circuit (2006–2017)
After the one-off appearance at the WWE produced ECW One Night Stand, Funk then returned to the independent circuit and made appearances in Japan. He claimed to be semi-retired after wrestling in his last match in September 2006 against Jerry "The King" Lawler in an Extreme Rules match at The Great Plains Coliseum in Lawton, Oklahoma for the promotion Impact Zone Wrestling. Funk was also the special guest referee during the Raven and Johnny Webb vs. Khan Kussion and Homeless Jimmy match at "Cold Day in Hell" on May 24. On August 8, Terry made a surprise appearance for Insane Clown Posse's Juggalo Championship Wrestling at the 10th Annual Gathering of the Juggalos. He served as special guest referee for a match between Viscera and 2 Tuff Tony. Funk also appeared at the annual NJPW January 4 Dome Show in 2010, teaming with Manabu Nakanishi, Masahiro Chono and Riki Choshu to defeat Abdullah the Butcher, Takashi Iizuka, Tomohiro Ishii and Toru Yano. Funk was scheduled to be the special guest referee in a match between Kevin Nash and Hannibal for a Great North Wrestling event in Thunder Bay, Ontario in May 2010. During the press conference to announce his involvement, an altercation involving Funk and Hannibal damaged and possibly broke Funk's eardrum.

On September 11, 2010, at Ring of Honor's Glory By Honor IX, Funk worked as the ringside enforcer for the ROH World Championship match between Tyler Black and Roderick Strong. Funk appeared at the fifth WrestleReunion event at the LAX Hilton in Los Angeles, California from January 28 to 30, 2011. On the second day of the event, he competed in a Legends Battle Royale on the Pro Wrestling Guerrilla show. He lasted until the end where he was eliminated by Roddy Piper. Funk wrestled Jerry Lawler unsuccessfully in a "No holds barred contest" for Northeast Wrestling on October 1, 2011. On October 15, 2011, Funk unsuccessfully faced his long-time friend and protégé Tommy Dreamer at the AWE "Night Of Legends" event. In a shoot interview conducted the next day featuring himself and Dreamer, Funk stated that he believed that would be his last match. On January 12, 2013, Funk stated that he was officially retired from professional wrestling at age 68, however, it would seem that Funk would once again come out of retirement. On October 27, 2013, Funk returned to All Japan Pro Wrestling, teaming with Dory in a tag team match, where they wrestled Masanobu Fuchi and Osamu Nishimura to a twenty-minute time limit draw. On November 9, 2013, Funk appeared at House of Hardcore 3 as Tommy Dreamer's tag team partner. They defeated Sean Waltman and Lance Storm and the match was promoted as the last time Dreamer and Funk would wrestle together.

On December 11, 2014, Funk returned to Japan for a Tokyo Gurentai independent event, which saw him, Masakatsu Funaki and Mil Máscaras defeat Kaz Hayashi, Nosawa Rongai and Yoshiaki Fujiwara in a six-man tag team main event. On October 16, 2015, Funk made an appearance at AIW's Big Trouble in Little Cleveland event, where he attacked Eddie Kingston and his manager, The Duke, destroying the concession stand in the process. On October 24, 2015, Funk had his last match at USA Championship Wrestling in Jackson, Tennessee at Oman Arena against Jerry Lawler, Lawler went on to win by DQ. On September 17, 2016, Funk announced his retirement at House of Hardcore 17. Funk made another return to the ring on September 22, 2017, for the Big Time Wrestling promotion in Raleigh, North Carolina. He teamed with The Rock N' Roll Express in a six-man tag team match, where they defeated Doug Gilbert, Jerry Lawler and Lawler's son Brian Christopher via disqualification.

Other media
In 1989, Terry Funk appeared as a bouncer in the movie Road House with Patrick Swayze. In 1999, Funk was featured in director Barry Blaustein's wrestling documentary Beyond the Mat. His legendary toughness was attested to when cameramen followed him to a medical appointment, where he was told, by the doctor, that he should not even be able to walk without intense pain. He has also appeared in other movies such as Paradise Alley, The Ringer, and Over the Top. He released an autobiography, Terry Funk: More Than Just Hardcore, in 2005.
On May 11, 2010, Funk appeared on "Right After Wrestling" with Arda Ocal on SIRIUS Satellite Radio to discuss his possible retirement, to which he replied "I never really truly will retire". This was also the interview with the infamous quote, "I dislike Vince (McMahon). I'm jealous of Vince."

In 1985, Funk appeared in the short-lived western "Wildside". Only six episodes were aired. Behind the scenes, Funk choreographed the street fight between Rocky Balboa and his nemesis Tommy Gunn at the end of Rocky V. Funk's name can be seen in the end credits. Funk also had a short lived career in music. The release of the album "Great Texan" in 1984 which was a soft rock AOR oriented album. The album was met with mixed reviews and is generally considered a "cult classic" by fans. Funk has also appeared in several WWE video games, in WWE SmackDown vs Raw 2008 and WWE SmackDown vs Raw 2011 as himself and in WWE '13 as downloadable content as his Chainsaw Charlie gimmick.

In July 2022, Terry Funk released his self-titled biographical comic book through Squared Circle Comics.

Personal life
Funk married his wife Vicky Ann on August 14, 1965. They had two daughters together, Stacy and Brandee. For many years, Terry and Vicki owned a ranch in Canyon, Texas, which they later sold. Vicky died on March 29, 2019, as confirmed by Ted DiBiase on Twitter. In the documentary film Beyond the Mat, Funk is told by a doctor he needs a knee replacement. Years later, he had the operation.

Funk was close friends with NFL player John Ayers. Funk is also close friends with Sylvester Stallone. On September 12, 2016, Funk underwent surgery for an inguinal hernia, and was supposed to be resting and in bed for a couple of weeks, but chose to attend Tommy Dreamer's House of Hardcore shows.

In June 2021, fellow wrestling legend Don Muraco reported Funk was diagnosed as living with dementia and is living in an assisted living facility. However, on December 29, 2021, Ric Flair announced on his podcast with Mark Madden that Funk had returned home and was doing well.

Championships and accomplishments

All Japan Pro Wrestling
World's Strongest Tag Determination League (1977, 1979, 1982) – with Dory Funk, Jr.
Champion Carnival Distinguished Service Award (1980)
World's Strongest Tag Determination League Technical Award (1977) – with Dory Funk Jr.
World's Strongest Tag Determination League Teamplay Award (1980) – with Dory Funk Jr.
World's Strongest Tag Determination League Distinguished Service Medal Award (1984) – with Dory Funk Jr.
World's Strongest Tag Determination League Technique Award (1986) – with Dory Funk Jr.
World's Strongest Tag Determination League Technique Award (1987) – with Dory Funk Jr.
World's Strongest Tag Determination League Excellent Team Award (1990) – Dory Funk Jr.
Cauliflower Alley Club
Iron Mike Mazurki Award (2005)
Championship Wrestling from Florida
NWA Florida Heavyweight Championship (1 time)
NWA Florida Tag Team Championship (2 times) – with Dory Funk, Jr.
NWA Florida Television Championship (1 time)
NWA North American Tag Team Championship (Florida version) (1 time) – with Dory Funk, Jr.
NWA Southern Heavyweight Championship (Florida version) (2 times)
NWA Florida Television Championship Tournament (1971)
NWA Florida Heavyweight Championship Tournament (1979)
Extreme Championship Wrestling
ECW World Heavyweight Championship (2 times)
ECW Television Championship (1 time)
Hardcore Hall of Fame (Class of 2005)
George Tragos/Lou Thesz Professional Wrestling Hall of Fame
Class of 2010
Georgia Championship Wrestling
NWA Georgia Tag Team Championship (1 time) – with Dory Funk, Jr.
NWA Georgia Television Championship (1 time)
NWA Georgia Tag Team Championship Tournament (1978) – with Dory Funk Jr.
International Professional Wrestling Hall of Fame
Class of 2021
Jim Crockett Promotions / World Championship Wrestling
NWA/WCW United States Heavyweight Championship (2 times)
WCW Hardcore Championship (3 times)
WCW Hall of Fame (Class of 1995)
NWA United States Championship Tournament (1975)
Juggalo Championship Wrestling
JCW Heavyweight Championship (1 time)
National Wrestling Alliance
NWA Hall of Fame (Class of 2009)
NWA World Heavyweight Championship (1 time)
NWA Big Time Wrestling
NWA Brass Knuckles Championship (Texas version) (1 time)
NWA Hollywood Wrestling
NWA Americas Heavyweight Championship (1 time)
NWA International Tag Team Championship (3 times) – with Dory Funk, Jr.
NWA World Tag Team Championship (Los Angeles version) (1 time) – with Dory Funk, Jr.
Pro-Pain Pro Wrestling
3PW World Heavyweight Championship (1 time)
Pro Wrestling Illustrated
PWI Feud of the Year (1989) vs. Ric Flair
PWI Most Inspirational Wrestler of the Year (1997)
PWI Stanley Weston Award (2021)
PWI Wrestler of the Year (1976)
PWI ranked him No. 22 of the top 500 singles wrestlers in the PWI 500 in 1991 and the "PWI Years" in 2003
PWI ranked him No. 9 of the top 100 tag teams of the "PWI Years" with Dory Funk, Jr. in 2003
Professional Wrestling Hall of Fame and Museum
Class of 2004
Southwest Championship Wrestling
SCW Southwest Heavyweight Championship (1 time)
SCW World Tag Team Championship (1 time) – with Dory Funk, Jr.
Squared Circle Wrestling
2CW Heavyweight Championship (1 time)
St. Louis Wrestling Hall of Fame
Class of 2010
St. Louis Wrestling Club
NWA Missouri Heavyweight Championship (1 time)
Stampede Wrestling
Stampede Wrestling Hall of Fame (Class of 1995)
Tokyo Sports
Lifetime Achievement Award (1983)
Match of the Year Award (1980) with Dory Funk, Jr. vs. Giant Baba and Jumbo Tsuruta on December 11
Popularity Award (1979)
United States Wrestling Association
USWA Unified World Heavyweight Championship (1 time)
Western States Sports
NWA Brass Knuckles Championship (Texas version) (2 times)
NWA International Tag Team Championship (2 times) – with Dory Funk, Jr.
NWA Western States Heavyweight Championship (12 times)
NWA Western States Tag Team Championship (3 times) – with Ricky Romero (2 times) and The Lawman (1 time)
 NWA World Tag Team Championship (Amarillo version) (3 times) – with Dory Funk Jr.
NWA World Tag Team Championship (Texas version) (2 times) – with Dory Funk, Jr.
World Wrestling Federation/Entertainment
WWF Tag Team Championship (1 time) – with Cactus Jack
WWE Hall of Fame (Class of 2009)
Wrestling Observer Newsletter
Best Brawler (1989)
Best Heel (1989)
Best on Interviews (1989)
Hardest Worker (1989)
Feud of the Year (1989) vs. Ric Flair
Wrestling Observer Newsletter Hall of Fame (Class of 1996)

Filmography

Film

Television

Discography
Texas Bronco (1983)
Great Texan (1984)
Tougher Than Shoe Leather (2018)

Bibliography
More Than Just Hardcore (2013)
Terry Funk (2022)

References

External links

 
 
 

1944 births
American color commentators
American male film actors
American male professional wrestlers
American male television actors
American stunt performers
ECW Heavyweight Champions/ECW World Heavyweight Champions
ECW World Television Champions
Living people
Male actors from Texas
NWA/WCW/WWE United States Heavyweight Champions
NWA World Heavyweight Champions
Sportspeople from Amarillo, Texas
Professional wrestlers from Indiana
Professional wrestlers from Texas
Professional Wrestling Hall of Fame and Museum
Professional wrestling referees
Professional wrestling trainers
Sportspeople from Hammond, Indiana
Stampede Wrestling alumni
USWA Unified World Heavyweight Champions
Western States Sports
West Texas A&M Buffaloes football players
WWE Hall of Fame inductees
20th-century professional wrestlers
21st-century professional wrestlers
NWA Florida Heavyweight Champions
NWA Florida Tag Team Champions
NWA Florida Television Champions
NWA North American Tag Team Champions (Florida version)
NWA Southern Heavyweight Champions (Florida version)
WCWA Brass Knuckles Champions
NWA Americas Heavyweight Champions
NWA International Tag Team Champions
NWA Georgia Tag Team Champions
NWA National Television Champions
The Stud Stable members